After the split with Adam and the Ants, Adam Ant went solo, taking his song writing partner Pirroni with him. Merrick also briefly stayed aboard as drummer/producer for the UK edition of the first solo single "Goody Two Shoes" and demos for the upcoming Friend or Foe album before moving on to other production work, while Miall and Tibbs' contracts were left to expire.

1982–2001
With the old Ants all gone except Pirroni, and even he unwilling to perform live any more for the time being, Ant recruited a new band for touring, consisting of new dual drummers Bogdan Wiczling (ex-Fingerprintz) and Barry Watts (ex-Q-Tips), plus guitarist Cha Burns (also ex-Fingerprintz), bassist Chris Constantinou and the former Q-Tips brass section of trumpeter Tony Hughes and twin saxophonists Stewart van Blandamer and Steve Farr. Wiczling had already served as session drummer for the Friend or Foe album and had even re-recorded the drum part for Goody Two Shoes to fit the album sound – it was this reworked version of the song that achieved US success. The album sessions had also featured session brass players Jeff Daly and Martin Drover.

This new band made its debut at London's Astoria Theatre on 1 October 1982 (the day after Tibbs and Miall's contracts ran out) and played a further five UK provincial tour dates on 1–6 November 1982 before heading off to the USA for the start of a US tour in New York on 8 November. The New York concert was the first of 26 club-level US tour dates running up to the concert of 16 December 1982 in Hollywood California. These concerts were intended as a warm-up for a more intensive 1983 US tour of over 60 dates, scheduled to run until May 1983. However, on the nineteenth tour date on 20 February 1983 in Cleveland, Ohio, disaster struck when Ant suffered an injured knee onstage (a relapse of a previous injury suffered while filming Jubilee in 1977), forcing the postponement and/or cancellation of dates throughout February and March while he recuperated.  Ant eventually returned to action when he appeared as a guest performer on the NBC television network's Motown 25: Yesterday, Today, Forever special filmed on 25 March 1983 in Pasadena, California (and aired in May that year), performing Where Did Our Love Go, during which he was joined onstage by Diana Ross.  The following evening in Palm Desert, he resumed the US tour, which was finally completed on 18 May 1983 at the Bronco Bowl in Dallas, Texas.

During his recuperation from the knee injury, Ant had stayed in New York and Los Angeles and worked with Pirroni on writing new material. This and a further writing session with Pirroni in Paris in late May/early June formed the basis of Ant's second solo album Strip.  The album was recorded at Polar Studios in Stockholm in the late summer of 1983 with Phil Collins as both drummer and producer on both the title track and planned single Puss 'N Boots, with Richard James Burgess adopting the same roles for the non-single album tracks. The single "Puss 'N Boots" reached No. 5 on the UK charts, but the BBC banned both the video and the song for the follow-up single "Strip." Despite a vocal cameo performance from former ABBA member Anni-Frid Lyngstad, "Strip" only managed to peak at No. 41 before being withdrawn by CBS while the parent album barely scraped the UK Top 20. However, the Strip single fared quite well in America, only narrowly missing out on a US Top 40 hit single.  To promote the album, which reached No. 65 on the Billboard Top 200 albums, in early 1984 Ant undertook another extensive US tour, some 60 dates in length, starting on 27 January 1984 at the Atlanta Civic Centre in Atlanta in Georgia and lasting until 27 April 1984 at the Irvine Meadow Amphitheatre in Laguna Hills, California. Although UK television performances of Puss N'Boots and Strip had featured a quartet of Ant, Pirroni, Wiczling and Constantinou, the US tour featured the same seven-piece backing band as the previous album's tour, except for Steve King in place of Stewart Van Blandamer on saxophone. The tour shows were also notable for featuring a recreation by Ant of the Chinese Water Torture Cell escapology stunt originally performed by Harry Houdini.  In preparation for this, in keeping with the album title, Ant undressed onstage down to a pair of boxer shorts.

With promotion on the Strip album complete, Ant reduced his band to the quartet of himself, Pirroni (now out of retirement again), Wiczling and Constantinou.  The latter two adopted the stagenames Count Wiczling and Chris De Niro respectively and were upgraded from live backing musicians to being full-time band members, featured on record sleeves, logos and even in song lyrics.  Ant formally unveiled his new four-piece band, all clad in a leather motorcycle gang image, at the 1984 Montreux Pop Festival, where they gave a mimed performance of Dog Eat Dog, Goody Two Shoes and the Strip track Navel To Neck. Shortly thereafter, the new band began work with veteran producer Tony Visconti on Ant's third solo album, Vive Le Rock. Initial sessions in the summer of 1984 yielded the single Apollo 9, a UK No. 13 hit in September 1984; however the remainder of the album was not recorded until January–March 1985. That summer, Ant secured a spot at the Live Aid concert – the first live performance of the "Ant/Marco/Wiczling/De Niro" band – but was asked to cut his set to one song, for which he chose his new single, the Vive le Rock title track The single, however stalled at No. 50 in the UK, in part due to a pressing error with many copies featuring the A-side track on both sides.

A year after the top 15 hit success of Apollo 9, the parent album Vive Le Rock was released in September 1985, to mixed reviews. As part of the promotion, the band performed a live TV session for Channel 4 music show Bliss hosted by Muriel Gray.  Several songs were recorded, although only two – Miss Thing from the new album and Killer in the Home from Kings of the Wild Frontier – were actually transmitted.  Following a warm up date in Puerto Banús, Spain on 23 August 1985, a seventeen date UK Vive Le Rock tour was scheduled to start in Southampton on 10 September 1985, however due to insurance problems relating to the stage set (which included a particularly rickety bridge) and/or poor ticket sales, this was reduced to three dates – 25 September 1985 in London, 27 September in Birmingham and 28 September in Manchester. The tour fared better in North America with 34 US and Canadian shows from 11 October 1985 in Santa Cruz, California until 14 December 1985 in Fort Lauderdale, Florida.

Ant decided to pause his career in music at the end of 1985 to focus on his acting career. The Fort Lauderdale show was Ant's last full-length concert until February 1993. Indeed, between December 1982 and February 1995, Ant's only public live concerts outside North America were the four aforementioned UK/Spanish shows, Live Aid, a 1987 fanclub party performance, and a September 1994 EMI corporate event in Brighton. He severed ties with CBS in late 1986, following the release of the Hits audio/VHS compilation.

In 1990, Ant re-entered the pop music world with the album Manners & Physique, a collaboration with André Cymone, a solo artist and an early member of Prince's band. The album was another moderate success, and featured the single Room at the Top, which was a Top 20 hit on both sides of the Atlantic. Rough Stuff became the second single for the United States and Germany as Can't Set Rules About Love charted in the United Kingdom

In 1993, Ant toured in support of a planned album called Persuasion. On account of a regime change at MCA, the record company made the unilateral decision not to release this album on the basis that Manners & Physique had failed to achieve a gold sales certification. Ant was subsequently released from his contract with MCA and later signed by EMI. Persuasion remains unreleased to this day and, as a result, it has become something of a lost legend among "Antfans", although it circulates widely as a bootleg.

In 1995 Ant released the album, Wonderful. The title track was a successful single, as was a tour of the U.S. in support of the album. While Ant and his group (which retained longtime guitarist Pirroni) played in smaller venues than they had played in the 1980s, the houses were often packed with enthusiastic fans. The tour was cut short due to Ant and Pirroni both contracting glandular fever. Ant also played three shows at Shepherd's Bush Empire in London and did a mini tour of Virgin Record Shops playing selected tunes from the album Wonderful and signing records. Adam and his band also played shows in Dublin, Glasgow, Middlesbrough and Stoke-on-Trent.

In 1996 Ant and Pirroni recorded two new songs, Lamé and Inseminator, for the soundtrack to Ant's latest film Drop Dead Rock. Also around this time, they recorded a cover version of the T. Rex song "Dandy in the Underworld" which eventually emerged on the 2005 CD Redux. The duo continued to demo other songs around this time, including such titles as Tough Blokes, Justine, Picasso Meets Gary Cooper and Call Me Sausage, (the last of which leaked out into bootleg circulation among fans). These new songs with Pirroni were for Ant's own new label Blend Records. Pirroni later referred to these recordings as the Blend Demos. They also guested with such bands as Dweeb and Rachel Stamp.

While living in Tennessee with new wife and their child, Ant bought a portastudio, as a first step towards a home studio. Interviewed in 2000, Ant's then manager Bryan Stanton claimed that, since the Blend session, a second set of songs had been demoed and that Adam intended to compile a new album from the highlights of both sets.  Stanton reported of Blend that "there's loads of legal nonsense behind it. It was set up with two other people, and one of those people is causing a few problems. So what he needs to do is leave that and set up another one".

In 2000 Sony released Antbox, a 3-CD retrospective box set of Ant's career, including various unreleased demos, many of them from the original Ants' live repertoire of the early punk days.

In 2001, following the September 11 attacks, Ant recorded a charity single for New York firefighters; a double A-side of Neil Diamond's America with an X-rated new song of his own entitled Big Trouble. The latter received an aborted radio airplay on an edition of Nicky Campbell's radio show on BBC Radio 5 Live during which Ant was interviewed. In interviews from the time, Ant talked of numerous varied plans, including starting another new record label, reforming Adam and the Ants, and a star-studded benefit concert for a forest in Patagonia.

Here and Now Tour, new music (2002–03)
In 2003, Ant and Wonderful collaborator, Boz Boorer, teamed with the Dian Fossey Gorilla Fund (now called The Gorilla Organisation) in a reworking of Stand and Deliver as Save the Gorillas. This was to have been the title track for a five-track EP, together with four primate/jungle-themed covers. Originally intended as a benefit record for the endangered mountain gorilla, it was never released, due to copyright and licensing issues relating to the title track. One track from the EP, Jungle Rock, was eventually released on Boorer's 2008 solo LP Miss Pearl.

Ant also began writing songs again, following a visit to his house by old schoolfriend, Dave Pash, who had brought a guitar with him. The upshot of this was that it was reported that he was writing songs for an album Fist in the Skull in 2003, some of which were "very personal". Asked in retrospect about the project in a 2007 interview, Ant claimed that Fist in the Skull was the title of a song-idea, not an album title.

Ant made a guest appearance on an EP, Mike's Bikes by former Ants bassist Kevin Mooney's new band, the Lavender Pill Mob, on Mooney's own label Le Coq Musique. Ant provided lead vocals for Black Pirates, a reworking of the song Chicken Outlaw by Mooney's earlier band Wide Boy Awake, which was inspired by Mooney's departure from the Ants.

Bloomsbury concert and reissues (2003–2009)
In 2003, the successful Antbox was re-released due to popular demand, but presented in a different form. A television special entitled The Madness of Prince Charming
was aired in the UK in 2003 documenting Ant's career and his struggle with mental illness (he was diagnosed as suffering with bipolar disorder).

In 2004 and 2005, six remastered compact discs were released, spanning the years 1979 (Dirk) through to 1985 (Vive Le Rock). The CDs include previously unreleased demos and material from the "Ant vault". The project was overseen by Marco Pirroni, and includes a written message from Adam Ant. A limited edition box-set, 'Adam Ant Remasters', was made to hold all 6 of the albums and Redux. This product was re-released with all 7 albums in 2006.

In September 2006, he published his autobiography, Stand & Deliver. Marking the release of the book, Adam Ant did a UK book signing, which went from London to Edinburgh. After the success of the first edition the paperback edition was published (a year later, September 2007); it contains a new epilogue which covers the year following the initial hardback release.

Ant performed a live reading from his autobiography and played some of his songs at the Bloomsbury Theatre in London on 24 September 2007. It was his first live performance in 11 years.
The special performance is available on CD via adam-ant.net. The CD was officially released on 12 December 2008. The CD is not available in the shops, but only as an online purchase. It includes parts of the readings and songs performed on the night, complete with snatches of unscripted dialogue between Adam and his guitarist for the gig, Dave Pash.

In early October 2008, Ant was awarded the Q Music Icon Award. Receiving the award from The Sugababes, he said how flattering it was to get an award that last year had gone to Paul McCartney, and that it was an honour to be chosen for the work that he'd done in the past. He mentioned that he was looking forward to next year with anticipation, and not only because it would be the 30th anniversary of his first album release.

On August 2009, Cherry Pop Records UK, a subdivision of Cherry Red, re-released Manners & Physique, remastered with bonus tracks.

Return to live work: The Pirate Metal Extravaganza (2010)
On 4 March 2010, Adam Ant registered his new label Blue Black Hussar Ltd. as a private limited company at Companies House. That month also marked a return to live music. Ant's first live performance since The Bloomsbury in 2007 was at "Through The Looking Glass" bookshop in London on 18 March, at which he played "Ants Invasion", "Cartrouble", "Physical", and a cover of Iggy Pop's "The Passenger". A day later, on 19 March, Ant guested at a Zodiac Mindwarp and the Love Reaction gig at the Pipeline Bar, London E1, in which he provided lead vocals for the band's Top 20 hit "Prime Mover".
Ant performed yet another low key show at the Southwark Playhouse on Saturday 20 March.
During the intervals Ant talked about Sony records, how he rejected an alleged £2.6 million O2 deal, and a new album collaboration with Chris McCormack.

On the Sunday, he appeared at another nightclub in London, this time at the Camden Monarch's regular Sunday hard rock evening as part of his new assault on London's live circuit. He played alongside members of Zodiac Mindwarp's Love Reaction band for a second time that week, performing "Prime Mover" again. He was also called to the stage by headliners Metalworks for a version of Born to Be Wild before making his leave. After a night off, Ant was photographed outside the Groucho Club on Dean Street with Mighty Boosh star Noel Fielding, and the press reported on Wednesday that Ant was indeed back in the studio again after an absence of 16 years.

Adam Ant performed at The Troubadour Cafe on Friday 2 April. He played an extended live set of early Ants material including "Red Scab", "It Doesn't Matter", and "Lady", along with hits such as "Stand & Deliver", and even a rare live outing for "Prince Charming". The gig also saw the debut of Ant's new song,Gun in Your Pocket, the tale of the Russell Brand and Jonathan Ross incident involving Hayley's friend Georgina Baillie. Added to this was a cover of Johnny Kidd and the Pirates' "Shakin' All Over", a favourite live number that Ant has been performing since around 1990. With recent late night visits to the recording studio that week, Ant had the benefit of playing the last minute set with a full backing band with Will Crewdson and Dave Ryder-Prangley from the band Rachel Stamp providing guitar and bass respectively, Hayley Leggs drumming, Peter Olive with keyboards, and Tree Carr backing up the vocal sound.

On 9 April 2010 Adam Ant appeared on a bill featuring Angie Bowie, The Glitter Band, Spizzenergi, and Bubblegum Screw at the Scala, London, where he sang "Antmusic" and joined The Glitter Band along with Spizz of Spizzenergi for the finale of "I'm the Leader of the Gang". In the early morning hours, he went on to play his own set and was joined by Angie Bowie for a rendition of "Get It On" by T Rex. For this performance, Ant was backed by a similar band lineup to his previous Troubador performance except for one Johnny Love of the musical project Modernless, instead of Hayley Leggs on drums, plus an additional guitarist, Miles Davis Landesman.
On 13 April Ant appeared at the Gary Numan gig at the Scala, London, where he joined Numan on "Cars".
Ant's scheduled live appearances with The Glitter Band on Friday 16 April (in Birmingham) and Saturday 17 April (in Manchester) were cancelled due to plans for Malcolm McLaren's funeral that took place on Thursday 22 April.

Malcolm McLaren's funeral was held on the 22nd. Ant attended the high profile ceremony which had the cortège pass through Camden High Street on its route towards Highgate Cemetery. Images of Ant attending the event, several of them featuring him in the company of McLaren's former partner Dame Vivienne Westwood, featured prominently in much of the media coverage of the funeral. The night after, the band appeared at the Purple Turtle in Camden at Simon Price's Stay Beautiful evening, which was a warm up for the headlining show at the Scala on the 30th, (as was Adam's solo appearance in Portsmouth on the 29th). The Stay Beautiful performance featured the same lineup as the 9 April Scala lineup.

The sold out night on the last day of the month billed as "The Pirate Metal Extravaganza" would be the largest show that Ant had performed at since 1995. There was concern in the building as rumour had it (quite correctly) that Ant was still in Portsmouth, but fears were put aside just after 8pm as he turned up and headed off into the venue to chat to fans waiting around the merchandise stall. The evening was running late, but as the band – also named Adam Ant's Pirate Metal Extravaganza (as he explained at the start of the show) – went on, the place erupted, and rather than the expected half-hour set, the final running time was almost 3 times that, with a set consisting of several covers and a batch of Ant material spanning from 1977 to 1985, although one glaring omission from the set was the planned new single "Gun in Your Pocket" which was on the setlist but never performed. On this occasion, both Leggs and Love teamed up as double drummers (as had been the custom on several of Adam's previous backing bands, most notably Hughes and Miall in the early 1980s Ants), and two female backing vocalists (Sacha and Tasha), additional to Carr, were featured. Much of Adam's entourage were on the stage also, including promoter Simon "Barnzley" Armitage (also the designer of East-end fashion line Child of the Jago). Marc Almond and Simon Price were also in the audience that evening.

Following the concert, Ant returned to his holiday in Portsmouth, where he played further concerts including one at the Oasis Centre which ended in some acrimony between Ant and the venue owner and audience members. Ant subsequently returned to London where he and his band performed at the Paper Dresstival event at London's Paper Dress shop on 15 May.

World Tour of London (2010–11)
Ant was reported to have been rehearsing in East London, with a band retaining Landesman but otherwise featuring a new all-female lineup including former Babyshambles drummer Gemma Clarke and Suffrajets frontwoman Claire Wakeman on guitar. A possible concert on 12 August 2010 at the Electric Ballroom, featuring songs from the lost Persuasion album, was mooted but did not materialize. Some smaller guerrilla gigs were performed that Autumn which received no advance billing whatsoever, including a solo show at the Dark Mills festival at London's Colour House Theatre on 4 September 2010, the launch party of the Illamasqua store on 16 September (at which Boy George served as DJ), and a guest spot at the Monster Raving Loony Party's annual conference in Fleet, Hampshire, on 25 September.

On Thursday 21 October, Ant performed at the Union Chapel, London. The gig, which was announced only two days beforehand and billed as Adam Ant (the last of the Punkrökkers) and his new band of buccaneers appearing live on stage in ... "THE GOOD, THE MAD AND THE LOVELY WORLD TOUR OF LONDON 2010/11" featured a line up including both Crewdson and veteran Ant-guitarist Boorer with Love now appearing on bass guitar, and saw Ant singing a selection of iconic songs from his back catalogue. The support act was Scottish funkster Jesse Rae. Sixteen days later, on 7 November 2010, Ant, accompanied by Crewdson, appeared on Today Is Boring, the regular radio show of Carr and her husband Adam Carr on the online radio station Recharged Radio. Programme pre-publicity materials incorrectly claim that it was Ant's return to on-air radio broadcasts in 15 years; it was his return to on-air radio broadcast performance during that same period as he and Crewdson gave an acoustic rendition of his punk-era (and later CBS B-side) song Juanito The Bandito. In the preceding interview, among other topics Ant revealed that the ...Blueblack Hussar ... album had now been rerecorded on a laptop studio belonging to Boorer and would consist of twelve songs, six co-written with Boorer, the other six co-written with McCormack (but made no mention of the previously intended collaborations with Baillee, Pirroni or Bell).

Ant headlined at the Scala again on 18 November (in a concert billed as the second date of his "THE GOOD, THE MAD AND THE LOVELY WORLD TOUR OF LONDON 2010/11" and featuring support from Birmingham-based electro artist Johhny Normal, Rae again and Edward Tudor-Pole) and three days later, topped the bill at a tribute concert for former Ant Matthew Ashman on 21 November at the same venue, in a show also featuring later Ashman bands Bow Wow Wow, Chiefs of Relief and Agent Provocateur. Boorer, a schoolfriend of Ashman's, again provided guitar for Ant's set The concert on 18 November received highly positive reviews from The Daily Telegraph and former Guns N' Roses guitarist Duff McKagan in his column for the Seattle Weekly.

Ant thereafter made further broadcast media appearances – on Iain Lee's show on Absolute Radio on 28 November and, in a higher profile, on ITV's London Tonight regional news programme on 14 December. This featured Adam in preparation for two upcoming further dates of his "... WORLD TOUR OF LONDON" for 16 December at the Electric Ballroom in Camden and 21 December at the London Forum. The concerts attracted some controversy for their £50 ticket price and an incident with a heckler that forced an abrupt end to the Electric Ballroom gig as well as the last minute move of the Forum concert to the Relentless Garage in Islington. Ant was back playing live two days later on 23 December, when he and Baillee guested onstage at the Christmas party of West Rocks at Shepherds Bar in Shepherd's Bush and played live again at Proud, Camden on 5 January 2011 and at Madame Jojo's in Soho on 17 January. He finished the month by playing further dates of his "... WORLD TOUR OF LONDON ..."  with a two-night stand at the 100 Club on 26 and 27 January 2011.

UK tour – first leg (2011)
Ant subsequently spent time in Paris where he played low-key shows (his first gigs outside the UK in nearly 16 years.). On 29 March 2011, Ant held a press conference and media preview gig at Under The Bridge in Chelsea at which he formally unveiled plans for an eleven date UK concert tour (as with the Paris concert, the first such event in 16 years) due to run from 16 May to 4 June 2011.  Also announced at the Chelsea event was a public screening of the December 1981 Prince Charming Revue concert video plus a question-and-answer session to be held in South London's Coronet Cinema on 11 May 2011.

While awaiting the tour, Ant continued to perform solo concerts including a Get Tested Hepatitis C fundraiser on 31 March 2011 at London's Jazz Café (at which he duetted with fellow pop icon Boy George), a show at Woody's tattoo parlour in High Wycombe, Buckinghamshire on 1 April 2011, the We Love Japan fundraiser for victims of the Tōhoku earthquake marking his return to the Relentless Garage on 2 April 2011, a book launch at Monto in London on 7 April 2011, London's St Moritz club on 22 April and the Zetland Arms in Kingsdown on 29 April. A more formal tour preview gig with the full band was held on 9 May at Bush Hall in London and a solo gig was included as part of the proceedings at the aforementioned Coronet Cinema concert video screening two nights later on 11 May.

By the time the tour itself got underway on 16 May in Brighton, the original eleven date itinerary had been expanded to fifteen dates. In defiance of sceptics, Ant successfully completed the entire schedule of tour dates which were overwhelmingly enthusiastically received – Dave Simpson of The Guardian rated 24 May 2011 Sheffield Academy concert four stars out of five, lauding "Ant still has the moves. However, this near two-hour voyage through his back catalogue delves beyond the hits. From his edgy, left field punk days, Zerox, Car Trouble and the rest sound icy, sensual and dangerous. This entertaining, fun show has everything: sex (he playfully removes a backing singer's top and hands it back, quipping, "Phew, I don't need that at my age"), surreal banter ("Hello, I'm Bryan Ferry") and controversy (Bob Geldof is "a twat")." and concluding " If an apparently finished album is anything like as good, Prince Charming's could be one of the great pop comebacks."

The Wolverhampton Express and Star praised his show of 1 June 2011 at the Birmingham's O2 Academy saying "From the moment the Prince Charming singer opened his mouth for his first song, Plastic Surgery, his performance was full of energy with him barely pausing for breath as he played hit after hit." Even the one serious negative onstage incident, at Fat Sam's in Dundee on 21 May 2011 when Ant reacted angrily to some crowd elements who booed his kilt decorated with the St George's Cross (as previously worn at the Dark Mills concert) was mitigated by local newspaper The Courier as merely a "disappointing end to what had been a great show by the 56-year-old, who still looks the part and still managed a near two-hour set including hits like Goody Two Shoes, Stand And Deliver, Dog Eat Dog and Kings of the Wild Frontier, bringing huge cheers and two encores." The tour closed in Manchester on 5 June with a show at the city's Manchester Academy which was applauded by frequent supporter John Robb in hyperbolic fashion: "What a great singer he is, the yodelling is really fab, it's that very Adam touch of pure pop and dark underground... this is one of the great rock n roll voices, a brilliant clarity that cuts like a knife even two weeks into a tour.  The set list is perfect. Loads of 'Dirk' period stuff. Plastic Surgery, Kick, Cartrouble, Cleopatra, Physical but also the hits including a great stripped down Prince Charming, and a whole host of off the cuff covers. It's packed in here – Totally sold out.... The word is out. The tour has been brilliant and this is one of the great comebacks."

Similar acclaim was given to the five date Seaside Tour of coastal resorts in the south of England which Ant undertook on 17–22 June 2011. Local Cornish radio station The Source FM cheered 18 June 2011 Falmouth concert on its website: "The audience goes wild. Adam stalks the stage, in control, he already knows he's got us ... he plays songs that a man in his mid fifties shouldn’t really get away with, but he does, with dignity. Here's a man who still has something to say and manages to say it with 30 year old songs...Someone boos, Adam retaliates and we're with him. There’s nothing to boo here... Did that really just happen? Did Adam Ant really just blow us all away with the best gig of the year so far? I think he did." The Seaside Tour served both as a follow-up to the main UK tour and a warm-up to Ant's appearance at Hard Rock Calling 2011 in Hyde Park on 26 June 2011, third on the bill to Rod Stewart and Stevie Nicks before an audience of 45,000. The festival's official website lauded his performance, reporting that "Adam Ant returned to London in tip-top shape this afternoon on the Main Stage in Hyde Park ...he left the stage to rapturous applause and cheers, leaving no question as to who was the real Prince Charming this weekend."

After Ant slotted in some more solo gigs, including the Soho Festival in London's Wardour Street on 11 July, he and the band next played the Guildford GuilFest festival on 15 July. His set won applause from online reviewer Virtual Festivals, who reported that the band "rocked the Good Time Guide Stage at Guilfest, leaving festival-goers wondering why anyone was watching anybody else. Unlike some of the other performers across the day, interaction with the crowd was at its peak and the band were introduced in full, mid-set, sandwiched amongst favourites such as Antmusic, Stand and Deliver and Goody Two Shoes." The next day, 16 July 2011 he played the Southwold Latitude festival., winning more critical praise as Clash's online reviewer commented "Ant knows how to write pop songs, and he knows how to entertain ... Ant (and his saucy backing vocalists) flirts with the crowd, and need only say two words to us ("Good afternoon") the whole show, but with such a cheeky grin, he doesn't need to elaborate. The Adam Ant of today's Latitude shows no flakiness of recent times, and it's testament to his enduring popularity that fans are left wide-eyed, grinning and speechless by a performance that's every bit as theatrical as you'd hope." Writing for The Guardian, Paul Lester likewise enthused "Adam Ant was a revelation, albeit mystifyingly low on the bill. He looked in great shape and sounded even better, treating the sheltering hordes to one thrilling hit after another"

UK tour – second leg (2011)
On 31 July 2011 Ant guested at Wayne Hemingway's Vintage Festival at the Southbank Centre and his band played two more shows at Chelsea's Under The Bridge (site of 29 March press conference/preview gig) on 5 and 6 August 2011. Ant performed solo at a screening of the 1981 Adam and the Ants "Live in Japan" concert video and the recent Hyde Park show at Finchley's Phoenix Cinema, He completed his summer with two festival appearances with the full band over the Bank Holiday weekend – firstly headlining at the West Dean Festival on 27 August 2011 and the next day 28 August playing at the Voewood festival in Kelling, Norfolk.

Ant also announced a follow-up UK tour (described as the "second leg" of the 2011 tour), initially scheduled to run for twelve dates from 11 November 2011 in Bristol until 13 December 2011 in Newcastle. As with the previous leg, Ant passed the time until the tour playing one-off dates, appearing with his tour band in Bedford on 10 September before three days later reuniting with 2010 band members Crewdson and Love for a charity show on board . He then played a three night series over 7–9 October, appearing in York and Clacton with his full current band and Brighton's Expo festival solo and followed this with two more solo appearances, one at a 'Burlesque Evening' on 15 October in Deal, the other at St Joseph's School on 20 October.

As with the previous tour, the itinerary was expanded from the initial 12 dates to an eventual 21 dates running from 10 November in Frome until 16 December in Norwich, (with a non-tour acoustic gig at a benefit event for London's Wilton Hall venue thrown in for good measure). Likewise as with the previous tour, Ant completed the entire schedule and to further hugely positive reviews.  The Irish Evening Herald praised his concert of 25 November at Dublin's Vicar Street venue: "He ain't like other performers, this guy. One drum kit could never be good enough for the likes of Stuart Leslie Goddard ... Plastic Surgery? A terrific opener. Stand and Deliver? Even better now than it was then. Prince Charming? Terrific, as always. And hey, that Marc Bolan tribute at the end more than sealed the deal ...  there was no time for chit chat.  Which, incidentally, pretty much sums up Adam's live performance these days: no chit chat and no messing about. A straight-up display of raw, often deafening post-punk, Adam's way of keeping the crowd happy is to play as many tunes as possible.  He's well aware of what the people came to hear, so he gives it to them. Better still, his voice remains in fine shape. Oh, and as for the 'Posse'? Let's just say that 'The Good, The Mad and The Lovely' is a more than suitable moniker.". The Southern Daily Echo heaped similar adulation upon the concert of 18 November 2011 at Eastleigh's Concorde Club: "Adam Ant, along with his backing band of The Good, the Mad and the Lovely possee, showed he can still rock, even in his mid-50s now. We wanted to hear the greatest hits, and Adam duly delivered ... The crowd lapped it all up ... It was a brilliant evening."

There was a local controversy over the Guildford Civic Hall show on 6 December 2011 after the venue's publicists had indulged in flyposting to promote the concert. Three days later, The Wolverhampton Express and Star once again turned out for the tour, this time attending the concert of 9 December 2011 at the city's Wulfrun Hall and again coming away suitably impressed. "Loyal fans were strong in their support for the star and packed out the Wulfrun Hall in Wolverhampton last night to see the 57-year-old Prince Charming perform again.  The singer, famed for his outlandish outfits, did not disappoint and took to the stage last night in a classic brocaded hussar jacket and pirate hat ... Ant gave the fans exactly what they wanted including such hits such as Stand and Deliver and Prince Charming.  Despite difficulties with the sound in places which made it difficult to hear the lyrics the joy for those in the audience was palpable."

Also once again turning out for this tour was John Robb who again ecstatically reviewed the Manchester date of the tour (14 December 2011 at the HMV Ritz) for his Louder Than War website.  Robb singled out for particular praise new album track Vince Taylor (about the 1960s musician of that name) which was premiered on the tour.  "Vince Taylor is primetime Adam Ant. It sounds like those off the wall early pop songs like 'Young Parisians' crossed with the 3D filmscapes of the 'Kings of the Wild Frontier' album and sounds like a potential single with its nagging riff in the verses and its great melody. It's great to hear a new song in a near two-hour set of Ant classics and obscurities and is a hint at the healthy future of this remarkable comeback from Adam... People keep talking about the best new band of the year. In a weird way here it is right in front of you. Decades in and Adam Ant sounds fresher than ever, reinvigorated he sounds like he has just started ... As Adam strips down to semi nakedness during the filthy Physical- the long, slow f—k of the set has reached its climax. It seems astonishing when you think about it but Adam Ant is currently fronting one of the best rock n roll shows in the UK right now."

Just three days after the final Norwich date of the tour, Ant was back onstage again with two members of his live band on 19 December at a charity event at Ronnie Scott's. The first record release of Ant's 2010s comeback also occurred at this point, with the release of the Sex Drugs and HIV compilation album featuring Ant's version of Get A Grip which had been recorded a year earlier while the World Tour of London was in progress.

Photo exhibition and Australian tour (2012)
A few days before the end of the second leg of his UK tour, it was officially announced that Ant would be making his return to the US with a 15 date North American tour in February 2012, starting on 2 February in Ant's former adopted hometown of Los Angeles and running until 25 February in nearby Anaheim. A few days into the new year, however, it was announced that the tour was postponed until the Autumn. A five-date warm-up UK mini tour for Ant and his band nonetheless went ahead for 19–24 January 2012. The mini tour – and Ant – received some unexpected publicity three days before the opening date when a 36-year-old Japanese female was detained in a raid on Ant's home by the UK Border Agency pending deportation due to an expired visa<ref>{{cite web|first=Chris|last=Hughes |url=https://www.mirror.co.uk/news/top-stories/2012/01/17/adam-ant-house-raided-at-dawn-over-illegal-immigrant-friend-115875-23703386/|title=Adam Ant house raided at dawn over 'illegal immigrant friend – Mirror Online |publisher=Mirror.co.uk |date=17 January 2012 |access-date=2012-04-11}}</ref>

An exhibition of photographs of Ant – entitled Adam Ant – Dandy in the Underworld ran from 7 March 2012 to 29 April 2012 at Proud Camden in London, featuring images of Ant throughout his career, including the work of Chris Duffy, Gerard McNamara, Jill Furmanovsky, Denis O'Regan, Chris Cuffaro, Hannah Domagala, Robert Matheu, David Corio and Janette Beckman.  To promote this exhibition, Ant performed a solo charity concert at the gallery on 6 March with the same two band members as the Ronnie Scotts concert from the previous December.  The concert was well received, although an inebriated Chrissie Hynde who was in attendance, heckled throughout the performance. While this exhibition was on, Ant took his band on tour to Australia with an initial five date schedule spread over a two-week period from 23 March to 8 April, taking in Sydney, Perth, Melbourne, Adelaide and Brisbane. In mid February, Ant made a warm-up visit to Australia, including an appearance on the Adam Hills in Gordon Street Tonight show recorded on 13 February 2012 for transmission on 15 February and promotional work in Melbourne and Sydney.

Although poor ticket sales forced the cancellation of the Adelaide gig, the remaining four concerts all went ahead.  The Sydney Morning Herald gave a reservedly positive review of the opening Sydney date on 23 March (which it rated three stars out of five), noting "In a set plus two encores (the first cheered for; the second not really but played anyway) comprising 30 songs, it was kind of the equivalent of throwing a lot of make-up at the mirror and seeing what stuck.  There were more excursions than expected into the patchy punk-rock of late-1970s Adam and the Ants and, with only guitars to provide melody, the early-1980s, solo-era Goody Two Shoes didn't work as well as it should have – even sampled brass would have helped there.   But when things came together you could see why Ant still inspires such dedication in the faithful. The likes of Ants Invasion, with its piercing, menacing lead-guitar line, and the sleazy, swaggering glam of Physical showed that there were enduring gems among the album tracks and B-sides, while hits such as Stand and Deliver, Antmusic (sweetly dedicated to Molly Meldrum) and Prince Charming reminded you what a deliciously odd pop star he truly was.". Ant also made further Australian TV appearances including a return to Adam Hills in Gordon Street Tonight recorded on 26 March for transmission on 28 March, including live performances of Stand and Deliver and new album track Vince Taylor with his full band.

Subsequently, for the second year running, Ant was scheduled to make appearances on the summer festival circuit, interspersed with various one-off dates around the UK.  This got off to an early start when Ant stepped in as replacement headliner at the Bearded Theory festival in Derby on 18 May 2012, when the Levellers had to pull out due to one of the band members being injured. Ant also played the first full band concert in continental Europe of his 2010s comeback on 24 June 2012 at the Parkpop festival in the Zuiderpark in the Hague, Netherlands, with his set broadcast on Dutch national TV.  After six assorted dates around the UK in early July, Ant's next major show was a headline slot at the Silverstone Classic Festival on 21 July followed the next day by an appearance at Rewind in Perth and then at Camp Bestival on 27 July 2012. The rest of the summer saw Ant mix festivals such as the Summer Sundae Weekender on 18 August, Solfest on 24 August and the Isle of Wight Bestival with dates in such locations as Swindon, Southend-on-Sea, Warrington and Croydon.

Later in the year, Ant's postponed US tour finally went ahead, commencing 13 September in Los Angeles and finishing on 20 October in nearby Anaheim.  The third UK tour of the 2010s, the Blueblack Hussar Tour, commenced on 1 November in Glasgow and ran to 30 November at London's Shepherd's Bush Empire. During the tour, the first single of the new album was released – Cool Zombie, with the formerly planned A-side Gun in Your Pocket now as the B-side.  On New Year's Eve 2012, Ant and his full band appeared on Jools Holland's Hootenanny New Year music show, performing new album track Vince Taylor as well as old hits Stand And Deliver and Antmusic.

Adam Ant is the Blueblack Hussar in Marrying the Gunner's Daughter (2013)
The album, the focal point of the comeback since 2010, finally received its release on 21 January 2013.  Its gestation had a long history which had been running alongside the live comeback; in 2009, it was announced that Ant was planning on putting a new record out. Adam also expressed interest in working with The Kaiser Chiefs.

In an April 2010 interview for the NME, Ant announced he was also working a new album, with the title Adam Ant Is the Blueblack Hussar in Marrying the Gunner's Daughter. This was planned to feature collaborations with former 3 Colours Red guitarist Chris McCormack, Ant's long-time songwriting partner Marco Pirroni, a member of Oasis (later identified as Andy Bell) and Morrissey's writing partner Boz Boorer. According to Ant, the album is a "live record that lends itself to performance" and will feature a "kind of concept. It's a very old fashioned, old school, step-by-step album". In addition, Ant rerecorded a song in tribute to the late Sex Pistols manager Malcolm McLaren, who died earlier that month, and who also once managed Adam & The Ants. Named Who's A Goofy Bunny Then?, the track was only previously available as a demo recorded in the early 1980s, but Ant said he wanted to release a new version in tribute to the late punk manager. "Malcolm was a sort of mentor in my life" he explained. "As close as you can get to a surrogate father." The song took its name from a term of endearment bestowed upon McLaren by Ant – referring to his "quite prominent teeth".

On 31 December 2010, Ant gave an interview for The Sun (featured in the "Something for the Weekend" segment) in which he discussed in considerable detail the various controversies surrounding his recent life and musical activities. He summed up his upcoming album thus: "The Blueblack Hussar is me coming back to life. I'm like The Terminator – I was a dead man walking". He also discussed individual songs on the album – as well as Gun in Your Pocket (which, aside from the Troubador live performance, had also been given a club dancefloor play by Ant himself as guest DJ at the Family Affair clubnight in Shoreditch, London on 24 April 2010), 31 December 2010 Sun interview also made mention of Shrink, a song about Ant's experiences in the mental healthcare system. Ant had previously discussed both of these songs in his April 2010 interview with Simon Price for online fanzine The Quietus. On his second visit to Iain Lee's show on Absolute Radio on 4 January 2011, two further new tracks were premiered – Hard Men Tough Blokes and punkyoungirl . In an interview for Bizarre magazine published that month, Ant named the song co-written with Andy Bell as Cool Zombie21 January 2013 release date was officially announced by Ant onstage at his September 2012 concert in Chatham by Ant's own record label Blueblack Hussar Records.  Despite the decidedly DIY nature of the release, the album reached number 25 on the UK Albums Chart, only one place lower than its predecessor had managed when released on the corporate EMI label nearly eighteen years earlier. It had previously been at number 8 in the Midweeks.

To promote the album, Ant performed a series of concerts around the British Isles during April and May (billed as a "Spring Tour") culminating in a gig at The Roundhouse on 11 May.  A free concert in Rome took place on 14 June and a second full length 40 plus show US tour got underway on 17 July in San Diego and ran to 21 September in Anaheim. Prior to the tour, Ant and his band appeared on NBC's Late Night With Jimmy Fallon to promote the new album, performing the track Vince Taylor.

Dirk and Kings reissues and album/Anthems tours (2014-2018)

During early 2014, Ant was at work recording his next album, titled Bravest of the Brave.  On 19 April, Ant performed his debut album Dirk Wears White Sox at the Hammersmith Apollo with a band including former Ants Dave Barbe and Lee Gorman, preceding this with several UK tour dates.  He also reissued the Dirk album on white vinyl on his Blueblack Hussar label, with a launch party gig at the 100 CLub.  Both London concerts were filmed and later released as the DVD album Dirk Live At The Apollo.  Ant would subsequently perform the full album again with his regular band for four nights at the Islington Assembly Hall in November 2014 and a full UK tour in Spring 2015.  Jack Bond's documentary on Ant, The Blueblack Hussar, covering his life and performances from late 2010 to mid 2011, was released on DVD in July 2014 by Sunrise Pictures.

Ant toured the UK in 2016 and North America in  early 2017, performing his Kings of the Wild Frontier album in its entirety. Sony Records issued a deluxe box set of the album linked to the UK leg of the tour, including a gold vinyl pressing of the album (as previously announced by Ant at the 100 Club gig in 2014).  After his 24 January 2017 show in Boston, Ant's Guitarist and Music Director Tom Edwards suddenly died mid-tour due to suspected heart failure. He was 41. After cancelling shows in New York and Philadelphia, the tour continued.

Later the same year, he toured the UK and announced he would return to North America with another tour, "Anthems: The Singles" in the autumn, and afterwards would be taking the Kings tour to  Australia and New Zealand. A further US leg of the Anthems tour is scheduled for August 2018.

Friend or Foe & Antics tours (2019-present) 
In 2019, Ant announced a tour to celebrate his first solo release Friend or Foe, playing the album live in its entirety as well as other fan favorites. Plans to continue the tour into 2020 ended due to the global spread of the SARS-Cov-2 virus.

In May of 2021, Ant announced the "Antics" tour with UK dates that went well into March of 2022.
 

Discography

 Friend or Foe Strip Vive Le Rock Manners and Physique Wonderful Adam Ant Is The Blueblack Hussar in Marrying The Gunner's Daughter''

Awards and nominations

References

British music history